Azra Raza is the Chan Soon-Shiong Professor of Medicine and Director of Myelodysplastic Syndrome (MDS) Center at Columbia University. She has previously held positions at Roswell Park Comprehensive Cancer Center, University of Cincinnati, Rush University, and the University of Massachusetts. Raza's research focuses on myelodysplastic syndrome and acute myeloid leukemia.

Most recently, she is the author of The First Cell: And the Human Cost of Pursuing Cancer to the Last.

Early life 
Raza was born in Karachi, Pakistan became
interested in biology as well as evolution as a child. Raza then went to
medical school in order to study biological sciences at Dow Medical
College.

Academic and research positions 
Raza moved to Buffalo to take a residency at Roswell Park, where she researched the biology and pathology of myeloid
malignancies. At the age of 39, Raza was named a Full Professor at Rush University in Chicago. Following this she worked as Charles Arthur Weaver
Professor of Cancer Research at Rush University, where she also
became the first Director of the Division of Myeloid Diseases. She was later
named the Director of Hematology and Oncology at the University of
Massachusetts, and then the Gladys Smith Martin Chair in Oncology. Raza was
also the Director of the Myelodysplastic Syndrome (MDS) Center at St. Vincent's Comprehensive Cancer Center.

Raza later became Professor of Medicine and Director of Myelodysplastic
Syndrome (MDS) Center at Columbia University.<ref
name="Journal"></ref><ref
name="DailyNews"></ref>

Research 
Raza's research has defined the Cell Cycle Kinetics of Myeloid Leukemia
cells in vivo in myelodysplastic syndrome and acute myeloid leukemia by
studying cellular proliferation in patients. This led researchers to believe
that low blood counts were not a result of bone marrow failure, but instead
a hyper-proliferative state in the marrow tissue, leading to their
hematopoietic cells to die of apoptosis.

Raza has also developed a tissue bank of cancer patients that contains
several thousand specimens of patient tissue for her research, which she
uses to identify treatment programs for various patients through genetic
testing. This also resulted in a research
partnership with the company Cancer Genetics in 2014, "to identify more
accurate diagnostic and prognostic markers for myelodysplastic syndromes
(MDS), as well as novel therapies to target this class of bone marrow
cancers."
Her research into acute myeloid leukemia has shown that a mutation in their bone-building osteoclast cells of patients with the disease could be one of the causes of the cancer they develop.

Raza has also used genomic technology to further research the pathology of myelodysplastic syndrome, as well as RNA Sequence and global methylation studies, and was a part of US President Barack Obama's "cancer moonshot" program, reporting to Vice-president Joe Biden.

Writing 
Raza's 2009 book Ghalib: Epistemologies of Elegance co-written with Sara Suleri Goodyear, analyzed the work of the Urdu poet Ghalib, and included translations of Ghalib's Ghazals that the co-authors performed themselves. Raza also facilitates Pakistani artists during visits to New York City. She also co-wrote Myelodysplastic Syndromes & Secondary Acute Myelogenous Leukemia: Directions for the New Millennium in 2001.

Raza's work has appeared in The New England Journal of Medicine, Nature, Blood, Cancer, Cancer Research, British Journal of Haematology, Leukemia, and Leukemia Research. She has also contributed to newspapers as an author, and has provided talks to organizations like TEDx New York.

The hypothesis that early detection and prevention of cancer may be the most humane solution for the cancer problem was summarized in Raza's essay in The Wall Street Journal, titled: "Cancer is still beating us. We need a new start".

Critical Acclaim 
Raza's 2019 book The First Cell has received critical acclaim from many sources:

The New York Times, Books to Watch For in October 2019
 Amazon, Top 100 Books of 2019
 LitHub, Most Anticipated Books of 2019
 BookRiot, Must-Read Books on Cancer
 Amazon, Best Science Books of 2019
 Starred Review from Publishers Weekly
 Starred Review from Kirkus

Henry Marsh in the New York Times said, "Raza suggests the first cancer cell that gives rise to a tumor is like a grain of sand that precipitates the collapse of a sand pile. Research, she says, should concentrate on finding these early changes, before an actual tumor develops."

The Times (London) reported, "Her most ambitious project, though, is the MDS-AML (myelodysplastic syndromes-acute myeloid leukaemia) Tissue Repository, in which tissue from every bone marrow biopsy she has taken over 35 years is banked. Founded in 1984, it's the oldest repository of its kind created by a single physician and contains 60,000 samples from Raza's patients, including, painfully, her husband's."

Barbara Kiser wrote in Nature: "Each year, the United States spends US$150 billion on treating cancer. Yet as oncologist Azra Raza notes in this incisive critique-cum-memoir, the treatments remain largely the same. Raza wants to see change: eliminating the first cancer cell rather than 'chasing after the last', which is doable with current technologies. Meanwhile, she braids often-harrowing stories of patients, including her own husband, with insights gleaned from laboratory and literature on this complex, often confounding array of diseases."

Personal life 
Raza was married to the late Harvey David Preisler, Director of Rush Cancer Institute. They have one daughter, Sheherzad Raza Preisler, who also lives in New York.

Awards 
Raza was a Hope Funds for Cancer Research honoree in
2012. She also received the Distinguished Services in the Field of Research and Clinical
Medicine award from Dow Medical College in
2014. Raza is the namesake of the Dr. Azra Raza scholarship award at her secondary school alma mater, Islamabad Model
College for Girls
F-7/2.

References

External links

American academics of Pakistani descent
Columbia University faculty
Living people
Year of birth missing (living people)
Pakistani emigrants to the United States
Dow Medical College alumni